Spinello is both a given name and a surname. 

Notable people with the given name include:
Spinello Aretino (c. 1350 – c. 1410), Italian painter

Notable people with the surname include:
Guglielmo Spinello (born 1941), Italian boxer
Natale Spinello (born 1947), Italian rower